Jenifa is a 2008 Nigerian comedy-drama film starring Funke Akindele. The film received four nominations at the Africa Movie Academy Awards in 2008. Akindele won Best Actress in a Leading Role at the Africa Movie Academy Awards for her role as Jenifa.

The film is the first installment in what has become a very popular franchise in Nigeria. A sequel was released in 2011, and a spin-off television series was launched in 2014.

See also
 List of Nigerian films of 2008

References

Nigerian comedy-drama films
2008 films
2008 comedy-drama films